John Toland (1670–1722) was an Enlightenment philosopher.

John Toland may also refer to:
John Toland (historian) (1912–2004), American author and historian
John Toland (wrestler) or Tank Toland (born 1979), American wrestler
John Toland (mathematician), mathematician active in analysis and partial differential equations

See also
John Tolan (disambiguation)